The 1983 Ogun State gubernatorial election occurred on August 13, 1983. UPN candidate Olabisi Onabanjo won the election.

Results
Olabisi Onabanjo representing UPN won the election. The election held on August 13, 1983.

References 

Ogun State gubernatorial elections
Ogun State gubernatorial election
Ogun State gubernatorial election